Leif is a male given name of Scandinavian origin. It is derived from the Old Norse name Leifr (nominative case),  meaning "heir", "descendant".

Use in the Nordic countries

Spelling and prevalence 
Across the Nordic countries, the most commonly occurring spelling of the name is Leif, however, there are some well-established regional variants:

  – Leiv
  – Lejf
  – Leifur 
  – Leivur 

In Norway, about 17,000 men have Leif as their first (or only) name. In Sweden, 70,000 men have the name Leif, about 60% of them as a first name.  As of 2018, about 15,000 Danish men have Leif as their first name. In Finland, as of 2012, 4,628 men have Leif as a first name. In the U.S., as of 2015, 6,415 men have Leif as a first name.

Pronunciation 
In Denmark, much of Norway, and the southern and western regions of the Faroe Islands, the name is pronounced more like "life", while the only exception to this pattern is in the northern and eastern regions of the Faroe Islands where it is an approximate rhyme with the English word "coif". In no Scandinavian region is the name pronounced like the most commonly heard English language pronunciation, "leaf", as that would be a homophone of the unrelated female name Liv/Lif.

People
 Leif Ove Andsnes (born 1970), Norwegian pianist and exponent of Edvard Grieg
 Leif Axmyr (1938–2018), Swedish murderer
 Leif Bergdahl (born 1941), Swedish physician and politician
 Leif Blomberg (1941–1998), Swedish trade unionist and politician
 Leif Davidsen (born 1950), Danish crime fiction writer
 Leif Davis (born 1999), English footballer 
 Leif Erikson ( 970 –  1020), Norse explorer regarded as having discovered North America before Christopher Columbus
 Leif Garrett (born 1961), Norwegian-American singer and actor
 Leif Hård (born 1944), Swedish politician
 Leif Hoste (born 1977), Belgian road cyclist
 Leif Juster (1910–1995), Norwegian comedian, actor and singer.
 Leif Larsen (1906-1990) Norwegian sailor and the most highly decorated allied naval officer of World War II
 Leif Linde (born 1955), Swedish politician
 Leif Nysmed (born 1970), Swedish politician
 Leif Olsen (1927–2012),  Norwegian footballer
 Leif Panduro (1923–1977), Danish novelist and dramatist
 Leif G. W. Persson (born 1945), Swedish criminologist, whistle-blower and novelist
 Leif Segerstam (born 1944), Finnish conductor and composer
 Leif Shiras (born 1959), American tennis player
 Leif Tronstad (1903–1945), Norwegian scientist, intelligence officer and military organizer
 Leif Vollebekk, Canadian singer-songwriter
 Le1f (born Khalif Diouf in 1989), American rapper and producer from New York
 Leif Arrhenius Swedish track athlete

See also

References 

Scandinavian masculine given names
Swedish masculine given names
Norwegian masculine given names
Danish masculine given names
Icelandic masculine given names